Shah Nur ol Din (also Romanized as Shāh Nūr ol Dīn and Shāh Nūr od Dīn) is a village in Posht Par Rural District, Simakan District, Jahrom County, Fars Province, Iran. At the 2006 census, its population was 42, in 9 families.

References 

Populated places in Jahrom County